Tsozong Gongba Monastery (also romanized as Tsodzong or Tsomum) is a small Tibetan Buddhism monastery in eastern Tibet, China.  The monastery, founded in 1400, practices the Nyingma tradition.  Tsozong Gongba is located on Tashi Island in the middle of Pagsum Lake in the Nyenchen Tanglha Mountains, part of Gongbo'gyamda County in Nyingchi Prefecture, Tibet Autonomous Region. Tsozong Gongba means "castle in the lake" in Tibetan. The monastery has four buildings situated around a small yard.

The construction of the Tsozong Gongba Monastery was chaired by the Nyin-gma-pa monk Sungye Lingpa and is now home of few nuns.

The three statues (Chenresig, Guru Rimpoché and Sakya Thukpa, see below) were actually shot and burned by the People's Liberation Army (PLA) during the Cultural Revolution, before being restored by the local lama Dudjom Rimpoche and his son Chuni Rimpoche (now a resident at Lamaling Monastery near Bayi town). A small kora around the monastery passes several hard-to-discern holy sites, including a Sky burial site, a 'body-print' of Gesar.

Gallery

See also 
 List of Buddhist temples
 List of Tibetan monasteries

References

External links

Buddhist temples in Tibet
Buddhist monasteries in Tibet
Buddhist temples in Nyingchi
Nyingma monasteries and temples